Berrian Mountain is a mountain summit in the Front Range of the Rocky Mountains of North America.

Mountain
According to Jefferson County Archives, Berrian Mountain was named after George, Dan, and Ray Berrian and the Berrian family who came from Kansas to Colorado in 1887.  Previously, it may have been called McIntyre Mountain after Duncan McIntyre, who owned property on the east side of the mountain where Midway House is located.

November 1, 1981, at 8:03 p.m. MST, a magnitude 3.1 tremor centered on Berrian Mountain.

See also

List of Colorado mountain ranges
List of Colorado mountain summits
List of Colorado fourteeners
List of Colorado 4000 meter prominent summits
List of the most prominent summits of Colorado
List of Colorado county high points

References

External links

Berrian Mountain on listsofjohn.com
Berrian Mountain on peakery.com

Mountains of Colorado
Mountains of Jefferson County, Colorado
North American 2000 m summits